Velinda lirata is a species of beetle in the family Carabidae, the only species in the genus Velinda.

References

Lebiinae